Tennessee's 24th Senate district is one of 33 districts in the Tennessee Senate. It has been represented by Republican John Stevens since 2012, succeeding Democrat Roy Herron.

Geography
District 24 covers much of rural northern West Tennessee, including all of Benton, Carroll, Gibson, Henry, Obion, and Weakley Counties. Communities in the district include Martin, Paris, Union City, Humbolt, Milan, McKenzie, Trenton, Huntingdon, Medina, Camden, and Dresden.

The district is located mostly within Tennessee's 8th congressional district, with a small section extending into the 7th district. It overlaps with the 75th, 76th, 77th, and 79th districts of the Tennessee House of Representatives, and borders the state of Kentucky.

Recent election results
Tennessee Senators are elected to staggered four-year terms, with odd-numbered districts holding elections in midterm years and even-numbered districts holding elections in presidential years.

2020

2016

2012

Federal and statewide results in District 24

References

24
Benton County, Tennessee
Carroll County, Tennessee
Gibson County, Tennessee
Henry County, Tennessee
Obion County, Tennessee
Weakley County, Tennessee